Dweep is a puzzle game published in 1999.

Dweep may also refer to:

Islands

India
 Lakshadweep, a group of islands in the Laccadive Sea, off the southwestern coast of India
 Jambudwip, in the Bay of Bengal
 Jawahar Dweep or Butcher Island, off the coast of Mumbai
 Kuruvadweep, a river delta on the Kabini River in Kerala

Elsewhere
 Chera Dweep, an extension of St. Martin's Island in the Bay of Bengal, Bangladesh
 Mahal Dweep, an obsolete name for the Maldives

Other uses
 Jambudvipa, the dvipa ("island") of the terrestrial world, as envisioned in the cosmologies of Hinduism, Buddhism, and Jainism
 Dweep Panchayat (Island Panchayat), an Indian administrative division
 Dweepa, 2002 film centering on an island

See also
 Div (disambiguation), a related form
 Dive (disambiguation), a related form
 Divi (disambiguation), a related form
 Dvipa, a related form
 Jambudvipa (disambiguation)